Josef Borghard (born 5 December 1933) is a German racing cyclist. He rode in the 1961 Tour de France.

References

External links
 

1933 births
Living people
German male cyclists
Place of birth missing (living people)
Cyclists from Cologne